The history of elephants in Europe dates back to the time of the Roman Empire, but previously, during the Ice Age, relatives of elephants were spread across the globe, including Europe. Mammoths roamed the northern parts of the Earth, from Europe to North America. The straight-tusked elephant of mainland Europe principally inhabited the Mediterranean, but reached the rest of Europe during warm interglacial periods. While it went extinct during the last Ice Age, insular dwarf forms such as the Cyprus dwarf elephant, the pygmy elephant, the Naxos dwarf elephant and the Rhodes dwarf elephant survived longer, and the last Mediterranean elephant species survived on Tilos until about 4000 years ago. Subsequently the presence of actual elephants in Europe was only due to importation of these animals.

Overview 

Europeans came in contact with live elephants in 327 BC, when Alexander the Great descended into India from the Hindu Kush, but Alexander was quick to adopt them. Four elephants guarded his tent, and shortly after his death his associate Ptolemy issued coins showing Alexander in the elephant headdress that became a royal emblem also in the Hellenized East. Aristotle depended on first-hand information for his account of elephants, but like most Westerners he believed the animals live for two hundred years. Roman scouts in the royal Syrian parks shortly before the last of the Seleucids fell to Rome had orders to hamstring every elephant they could capture, and while elephants performed in the circuses of Rome, Shapur's war elephants in the mid-4th century numbered in the hundreds (Fox 1973 p 338).

Elephants largely disappeared from Europe after the Roman Empire.  As exotic and expensive animals, they were exchanged as presents between European rulers, who exhibited them as luxury pets, beginning with Harun ar-Rashid's gift of an elephant to Charlemagne.

Examples 
Historical accounts of elephants in Europe include:

 The 20 elephants in the army of Pyrrhus of Epirus, which landed at Tarentum in 280 BC for the first Battle of Heraclea, recorded by Plutarch's (in Lives), Polybius, Dionysius of Halicarnassus and Livy. "The most notable elephant in Greek history, called Victor, had long served in Pyrrhus's army, but on seeing its mahout dead before the city walls, it rushed to retrieve him: hoisting him defiantly on his tusks, it took wild and indiscriminate revenge for the man it loved, trampling more of its supporters than its enemies". Coins of Tarentum after this battle also featured elephants.
 The 37 elephants in Hannibal's army that crossed the Rhône in October/November 218 BC during the Second Punic War, recorded by Livy.
 The first historically recorded elephant in northern Europe was brought by emperor Claudius during the Roman invasion of Britain in AD 43 to the British capital of Colchester.  At least one elephant skeleton with flint weapons that has been found in England was initially misidentified as this elephant, but later dating proved it to be a mammoth skeleton from the Stone Age.
 Abul-Abbas, the Asian elephant which Harun ar-Rashid gave to Charlemagne in 797 or 802. The animal died in 810, of pneumonia.
 The Annals of Innisfallen record that King Edgar of Scotland gave a large, exotic animal to Muirchertach Ua Briain in 1105, possibly an elephant but more probably a camel. (Annals of Innisfallen, s.a. 1105; A. A. M. Duncan, Scotland: The Making of the Kingdom (1975), p. 128)
The Cremona elephant presented to Frederick II, Holy Roman Emperor by Al-Kamil in 1229.
 The elephant given by Louis IX of France  to Henry III of England, for his menagerie in the Tower of London in 1255 (see: Sandwich, Kent). Drawn from life by the historian Matthew Paris for his Chronica Majora, it was the first elephant to be seen in England since Claudius' war elephant. Matthew Paris' original drawing appears in his bestiary, on display in the Parker Library of Corpus Christi College, Cambridge. The bestiary explains that while in residence at the Tower of London, the elephant enjoyed a diet of prime cuts of beef and expensive red wine, and is claimed to have died in 1257 from drinking too much wine. The accompanying text reveals that at the time, Europeans believed that elephants did not have knees and so were unable to get up if they fell over (the bestiary contains a drawing depicting an elephant on its back being dragged along the ground by another elephant, with a caption stating that elephants lacked knees – compare cow tipping). Europeans also interpreted descriptions of howdahs to mean that Indian elephants were capable of carrying actual stone castles on their backs, albeit only big enough to be garrisoned by three or four men; note that turreted war elephants did exist, though not ones made of stone. A carving of the elephant can be found on a contemporary miserichord in Exeter Cathedral. This animal may be the inspiration for the heraldic device 'Elephant and Castle', the arms of the Cutlers' Company of London, a guild founded in the 13th century responsible for making scissors, knives and the like. Its heraldry survived in an 18th-century pub-sign that in turn gave its name to a largely modern district in South London.
 In the 1470s King Christian I of Denmark founded a chivalric order, the Order of the Elephant, and had it confirmed by Pope Sixtus IV. The order takes its name from the battle elephants which symbolized the Christian Crusades. , it continues to be awarded under statutes established by king Christian V in 1693, amended in 1958 to permit the admission of women to the order.
 The elephant given by Afonso V of Portugal to René d'Anjou about 1477.
 The merchants of Cyprus presented Ercole d'Este with an elephant in 1497.
 Suleyman the elephant, a present from the Portuguese king John III to Maximilian II, Holy Roman Emperor.  Travelling from Spain in 1551, it arrived in Vienna in 1552, but died in 1554.
 Hanno, or Annone, was a white elephant presented by king Manuel I of Portugal to Pope Leo X on the occasion of his coronation in 1514. He died in 1518, probably of an intestinal obstruction misdiagnosed as angina, with Pope Leo at his side. His story is told in Silvio Bedini's The Pope's Elephant (Nashville: Sanders 1998). At the Villa Madama, in the garden facing the loggia, the Elephant Fountain designed by Giovanni da Udine depicts "Annone", whose tomb was designed by Raphael himself.
Hansken, a female elephant from Ceylon that became famous in early 17th-century Europe, touring through many countries demonstrating circus tricks, and sketched by Rembrandt and Stefano della Bella.

References
Footnotes

Sources

 Saurer, Karl and Elena M.Hinshaw-Fischli.  They Called him Suleyman: The Adventurous Journey of an Elephant from the Forests of Kerala to the Capital of Vienna in the middle of the sixteenth Century, collected in Maritime Malabar and The Europeans, edited by K. S. Mathew, Hope India Publications: Gurgaon, 2003 
Robin Lane Fox, 1974. Alexander the Great. Chapter 24 contains an excursus on Alexander and the elephant in Europe,
The Story of Süleyman. Celebrity Elephants and other exotica in Renaissance Portugal, Annemarie Jordan Gschwend, Zurich, Switzerland, 2010,

External links
Anecdotes of elephants as royal European status gifts.
exeter-cathedral.org.uk

Elephants
Elephants